The Secondary Education Quality and Access Enhancement Project (SEQAEP) project is designed to enhance the quality of education at the secondary level in Bangladesh by facilitating access to information through quality teaching materials and audio-visual demo of classes to teachers and students. The goal is to bring the entire project upazillas into Internet accessibility to facilitate the performance of various activities of SEQAEP. The project worked with Higher Education Quality Enhancement Project to develop education in Bangladesh with support from World Bank.

References

Educational projects
Secondary education in Bangladesh